The Federal District (Portuguese: Distrito Federal) was an administrative division of Brazil created by the Brazilian Constitution of 1891. During the Empire of Brazil the administrative unit that corresponded to this territory was designated the Neutral Municipality (Município Neutro). It was a legal entity under public law until 1960, in the territory corresponding to the current municipality of Rio de Janeiro.

With the transfer of the capital to the recently created city of Brasília, the new Federal District was created in the Brazilian Highlands in 1960. From 1960 to 1975 the same territory existed as the State of Guanabara, which in turn was incorporated into the municipality of Rio de Janeiro.

References

External links 
 Map of the Federal District in 1923

Former subdivisions of Brazil
1891 establishments in Brazil
1960 disestablishments in Brazil
States and territories established in 1891
States and territories disestablished in 1960